The 2015 Rietumu Bank Latvian FIM Speedway Grand Prix was the fifth race of the 2015 Speedway Grand Prix season. It took place on July 18 at the Latvijas Spīdveja Centrs in Daugavpils, Latvia.

Riders 
First reserve Peter Kildemand replaced Jarosław Hampel, who had injured himself during the 2015 Speedway World Cup. The Speedway Grand Prix Commission nominated Kjasts Puodžuks as the wild card, and Andžejs Ļebedevs and Jevgeņijs Kostigovs both as Track Reserves.

Results 
The Grand Prix was won by Maciej Janowski, who beat Nicki Pedersen, Troy Batchelor and Chris Holder. After heavy rain, the meeting was abandoned after 20 heats, with each rider having ridden five times. The result stood, as per FIM rule 077.1.4.1., shown below. As a result, second placed Pedersen reduced the deficit to Tai Woffinden to just nine points in the race for the world title.

Heat details

Intermediate Classification

References

See also 
 motorcycle speedway

2015 Speedway Grand Prix
2015 in Latvian sport